International recognition of the National Transitional Council of Libya was given by the majority of international states but was not universal.

By 2012, 104 United Nations members and two observer states had announced they recognised the NTC as the legitimate representative of the Libyan people, and some of them had indicated that they were recognising the NTC as the only legitimate representative of the Libyan people, severing diplomatic relations with Gaddafi's government in the process. Additionally, non-UN members, Kosovo, Palestine, the Republic of China (Taiwan), also granted recognition. The European Union and several individual countries, such as Switzerland, established a diplomatic presence in Benghazi, the former de facto headquarters of the council and the continuing location for many of its offices. NTC officials also met with representatives of Iceland and Mauritania, among other states, though these states were not known to have established permanent diplomatic relations (informal or formal) with the NTC.

The United Nations General Assembly, with 114 member states in favour to 17 opposed, voted on 16 September 2011 to recognise the NTC as holding Libya's seat at the United Nations. On 20 September 2011, the African Union officially recognised the National Transitional Council as the legitimate representative of Libya.

International standing

The council stated that it would like to be recognised by the international community. The Chairman of the Council told Al Jazeera that "there are official contacts with European and Arab [countries]".

Recognition
As of 30 November 2011, 102 UN member states and four other countries have stated they recognise the National Transitional Council as the sole legitimate representative body of Libya. On 15 July, many of these countries constituting the Libya Contact Group issued a joint statement that they consider the council to be Libya's "legitimate authority".

The number of countries recognising the NTC has increased rapidly since its fighters' entry into Tripoli on 21 August. Prior to the start of the battle, 35 UN member states had granted recognition. After the United Nations General Assembly voted to recognise the NTC's designated representative, acknowledging the council as Libya's governing authority, several countries that had previously opposed international recognition of the NTC reversed themselves by recognising it.

The NTC has been recognised by all five permanent members of the UN Security Council, though the recognitions of Russia and China followed anti-Gaddafi fighters' takeover of Tripoli, as well as all European Union member states.  All of the G4 nations except Brazil have also recognised the NTC. All NATO members except Iceland have formally recognised the council. However, both Brazil and Iceland voted in favour of the NTC at the UN.

UN observer states

Non-UN member governments

Countries that have voted against NTC credentials acceptance at the UNGA
Most of the SADC members, Kenya and Equatorial Guinea (AU chair at the time of voting) adopted statements about "all-inclusive government", unsuccessfully proposed to postpone the UNGA vote and subsequently voted against the NTC.

: Foreign Minister David Choquehuanca said on 9 September that Bolivia does not endorse the NTC and condemned "the actions of NATO in Libya". Choquehanca insisted Bolivia will "not recognize any transitional authority".
: On 3 September the Cuban Ministry of Foreign Affairs announced in a communique that Cuba is withdrawing its ambassador from Libya, because it does not recognise the transitional government. The statement warned, "Cuba does not recognize the National Transition Council or any provisional authority and will only recognize a government that is established legitimately and without foreign intervention, via the free, sovereign will of the Libyan people," and strongly criticised the NATO intervention and "the deployment of diplomatic and operative personnel in the field" by the NTC's international allies. Cuban Foreign Minister Bruno Rodríguez Parrilla repeated the statement at the meeting of foreign ministers of Bolivarian Alliance for the Americas on 9 September in Caracas.

: On 27 August, Deputy Foreign Minister Kintto Lucas said Quito would not recognise "a transition junta" until "the people declare it legitimate". Lucas added that the NTC was not a "real" government and so the Ecuadorian government could not recognise it. Lucas reiterated the government's position on 20 October, saying, "We do not recognize the NTC and we will continue in that line."

: Between 5 and 9 September the Libyan embassy in Maseru hoisted a second flag - the NTC flag. Foreign Affairs Minister Mohlabi Tsekoa said that it is too early to declare Lesotho's stance as a country.

: On 22 August, the head of the Libyan embassy in Windhoek, Salem Mohamed Krayem, decided to defect from the Gaddafi regime. Namibian officials such as Theo-Ben Gurirab, the Speaker of the National Assembly of Namibia, have made conflicting statements. In March, Gurirab said he supported Gaddafi because "Africans [...] believe in existential friendship: once a friend, always a friend". In August, he said Gaddafi has lost "his vigilance on the red carpet, doing the danger dance, which doesn't stop". On 23 August Namibian Foreign Affairs Minister Utoni Nujoma said officially, Namibia still has diplomatic relations with the Gaddafi government. On 22 September main opposition party - Rally for Democracy and Progress - recognised NTC, when the government decided not to recognise until democratic elections are held.
: On 3 September, President Daniel Ortega said that it refused to recognise the National Transitional Council of Libya.
: Foreign Minister Bernard Membe said on 28 August that the Tanzanian government supports the AU's decision not to recognise the NTC, but said his government will recognise the NTC if it takes over the Gaddafi government's remaining strongholds and establishes executive, legislative, and judicial organs for the whole country. Otherwise, he said Dodoma will hold off on recognising a new government of Libya until nationwide elections are held. The Libyan Embassy has taken down the rebel flag after hoisting it the embassy buildings in Dar es Salaam on 27 August. The flag was removed before the 48-hour ultimatum given by the Ministry of Foreign Affairs and International Co-operation ended. The green flag was not hoisted again. The Embassy also apologised to the Tanzanian government. Bernard Membe,  Minister of International Cooperation and Foreign Affairs of Tanzania, said on 30 September that contacts between the NTC and the Government of Tanzania are "underway to normalize". On 9 November Minister of Foreign Affairs of Tanzania said that his country will not recognise NTC unless the Libyan government will fulfill conditions set by the Africa Union.
: In March, the government of President Hugo Chavez said that it refused to recognise the Benghazi government and insisted that only the previous government was legitimate. Reinaldo Bolivar, Venezuela's Vice-Minister of Foreign Affairs for Africa, also insisted that "there were no problems until a coalition of US and European countries began the shelling", and expressed his support for a "diplomatic solution to the crisis". On 23 August, as major rebel successes on the battlefield including in Tripoli coincided with a wave of recognitions for the NTC, Chavez again stated that he would only recognise the government of Gaddafi. Chavez also accused the West of "kicking" and "spitting" on "the most basic elements of international law" (remarking that "This is like the caveman era"), and saying the United States "arranged this war. They provided the arms, the mercenaries. They better not attempt to apply the Libyan formula to Venezuela or we'll have to show them our power." On 25 August, Chavez denounced the latest attack against his country's embassy in Libya on 24 August, but the attack on embassy is disputed by some reporters on place. On 26 October, Chavez said that "For us, there is no government in Libya" and "We don't recognize the government that NATO has installed."
: On 3 November Foreign Minister Chishimba Kambwili said that Government is waiting for Cabinet approval to recognise the new Libyan government and then Zambia will reopen its embassy in Libya, because "if the people of Libya have agreed to change government then we will respect that".
: On 24 August, the Libyan embassy staff in Harare declared they would "follow the Libyan majority" and declare allegiance to the NTC, pulling down the green flag, raising the tricolour, and destroying portraits and posters of Muammar Gaddafi. On 25 August, Zimbabwe's Ministry of Foreign Affairs announced that country's government no longer recognises Libyan Ambassador Taher Elmagrahi because of his defection, and Elmagrahi may face expulsion from Zimbabwe. "We do not have diplomatic relations with NTC and the hoisting of its flag here is actually illegal," Foreign Affairs Secretary Joey Bimha said. Bimha said ZANU-PF, Zimbabwe's ruling party, refused to recognise the NTC because "Gaddafi remains the legitimate representative of the people of Libya." On 26 August, Foreign Minister Simbarashe Mumbengegwi declared Elmagrahi persona non grata and ordered him and his family to leave Zimbabwe within five days. On 1 September Zimbabwean police arrested foreign journalists in the Libyan embassy. The next day, staff of the embassy of Libya sought refuge in Botswana. The expulsion has broken the fragile coalition between Robert Mugabe and the Prime Minister Morgan Tsvangirai, who said: "My position is it is not up to Zimbabwe to decide what the sovereign right is of the Libyans. It is up to the Libyans to choose their representatives." On 15 September the Deputy Minister of Foreign Affairs, Robert Makhula said that Libyan ambassador and his staff were not expelled, but "simply asked to go back to Libya and receive credentials from the new authority since the NTC had no diplomatic mandate at this stage to assign ambassadors to other countries".

Countries that abstained at the UNGA vote

: On 22 August Libyan embassy "members shifted their loyalty en masse from Gaddafi to the rebel-led National Transitional Council (NTC)". On 23 August Foreign Affairs Minister Marty Natalegawa said that he hails the choice made by the people of Libya. On 3 September FM said in a statement that "Indonesia supports the National Transition Council's efforts to roll out a democratic transition in a peaceful manner". On 21 October Helmi Fauzi, one of the members of the Indonesian People's Consultative Assembly urged the government of President Susilo Bambang Yudhoyono to recognise NTC.

 On 30 September St. Vincent and the Grenadines foreign minister Douglas Slater said that its government decided to put its relations with Libya "on hold" until it will be satisfied that “there is a legitimate, proper established government”.

Other UN members who were absent for the NTC vote
: On 22 August, the Libyan embassy in Minsk lowered the green flag and raised the tricolour adopted by the NTC.

: On 30 August an official of North Korean embassy in Libya answered on the question about recognition that Pyongyang must "wait and see" to recognise NTC.

: On 14 June Liberian president Ellen Johnson-Sirleaf announced that "the Government of Colonel Gaddafi has lost the legitimacy to govern Libya", so the Liberian government decided to sever diplomatic relations with Libya by withdrawing its envoy in Tripoli and suspending the activity of the Libyan representation in Monrovia. She also added that they can be resumed when "the people of Libya reach a political settlement which offers the best hope of lasting peace".

: At 24 August, the Libyan embassy in Maputo raised the NTC flag over its buildings. At the beginning of September the Libya national basketball team, in Mozambique at the All-Africa Games, and the Libya national football team, in Mozambique for 2012 Africa Cup of Nations qualification, were playing under the NTC flag.

: On 11 June the opposition party People's Democratic League called on "government of Sierra Leone, led by President Ernest Bai Koroma to state publicly Sierra Leonean peoples solidarity and support for Libya against NATO terrorism" and not to recognise NTC. On 30 August Libyan embassy in Freetown pulled down the green flag of Libya, but not hoisted the new flag, what is reflecting the policy propagated by the host country, which government spokesperson Silvester Swareh said that "this government upholds and stands by any decision that the AU takes".

: The Libyan mission in Ashgabat defected from Gaddafi shortly after the start of the Battle of Tripoli. The head diplomat expressed support for the NTC and the revolution.

Other non-UN member governments
: On 26 August, the Sahrawi government and the Polisario Front issued a joint statement rebutting claims that 556 Polisario mercenaries were arrested in Libya, blaming the report on Moroccan propaganda. The statement asked "the new Libyan authorities, represented by the Transitional National Council", to immediately disavow the claims.

International organisations
Several international organisations formed a relationship with the National Transitional Council in Benghazi, and the NTC was formally accredited as Libya's legitimate representative by some of them.

 African Union: The AU has repeatedly urged both sides in the civil war to exercise "restraint" and has declared its opposition to violence as a means of resolving the conflict. A delegation of African heads of state representing the AU met with representatives of the rival governments of Gaddafi and the NTC in April 2011 to present a peace plan. Though Tripoli accepted the plan, the NTC rejected it over its failure to stipulate Gaddafi's relinquishment of power. The AU presented a new framework in early July with many of the same features of the rejected "roadmap", again calling for an immediate ceasefire and negotiations brokered by the United Nations and the AU ad hoc committee, which includes Congo–Brazzaville President Denis Sassou Nguesso, Malian President Amadou Toumani Touré, Mauritanian President Mohamed Ould Abdel Aziz, South African President Jacob Zuma, and Ugandan President Yoweri Museveni. On 22 August, the African Union Commission recognised the NTC "as the country's legitimate representative". However, on 26 August, the AU Peace and Security Council reportedly decided that the AU would not recognise the NTC and would insist on the formation of a unity government that includes Gaddafi loyalists. AU Commission Chairperson Jean Ping said on 29 August that "seat is waiting for [the NTC] in the African Union ... for the new Transitional Authorities", but it had to form a unity government first. He also disparaged recent alleged hate crimes against black people in Libya, saying, "The NTC seems to confuse black people with mercenaries." On 20 October AU lifted its suspension of Libya's membership in the organisation and said that it "would set up a liaison office in Tripoli".
: Reports indicate that the Arab League had been involved in a move by "a European leader close to Gaddafi" to encourage Gaddafi to leave Libya in return for him not being prosecuted for his actions against the population. The Arab League voted for a no-fly zone at a special meeting in Cairo. The National Transitional Council was said to have given its consent, and Amr Moussa, secretary general of the Arab League had been speaking to the National Transitional Council's head, Mustafa Abdul Jalil, for the first time. Following a special meeting of foreign ministers held on 12 March 2011, the Arab League voted to ask the United Nations to establish a no-fly zone over Libya. The league also declared that the Gaddafi regime had "lost its legitimacy" and that it would instead "cooperate with the national council". Libya was suspended from the proceedings of the Arab League. On 23 August, the Arab League decided to give Libya a seat at its next meeting, which Secretary-General Naril Elaraby offered to the NTC "as the legitimate representative of the Libyan people" two days later. On 27 August the Arab League, at its meeting of Foreign ministers in Cairo and in presence of the NTC's number two, Prime Minister and de facto Foreign Minister Mahmoud Jibril, formally readmitted Libya, turning over the country's seat to the NTC and effectively recognising the hitherto rebel body as the legitimate authority in Libya.
 Bolivarian Alliance for the Americas: President of Venezuela Hugo Chavez invited to Caracas on 9 September 2011 countries of the BAA "to draft a statement likely opposing the rebel-led reconstruction." On 9 September the members decided to recognise only Gaddafi as the legitimate representative of Libya.
: On 24 October 2011, CARICOM Chairman Denzil L. Douglas, the prime minister of St. Kitts and Nevis, acknowledged "the People of Libya" as being "presently led by the interim National Transitional Council (NTC)".
: EU leaders at a summit expressed political backing for the Libyan National Council. The Commission President José Manuel Barroso stated that "The problem has a name: Gaddafi. He must go". EU leaders also announced it would cut off all ties with Gaddafi and would instead deal with the council. After a meeting between Clinton and representatives of the council, the EU and the U.S have decided to talk to the council without officially recognising them, in order to seek further information on the group and its goals. During his visit to Benghazi on 11 May 2011, Polish Foreign Minister Radosław Sikorski said that the EU recognised the interim rebel council as a “legitimate interlocutor”. This visit was agreed with EU foreign policy chief Catherine Ashton. According to Polish Ministry of Foreign Affairs the Libyan Interim Transitional National Council is "recognized by the European Union and a vast majority of the international community as the right partner for political contacts in Libya." On 22 May, EU High Representative Catherine Ashton opened the EU Office in Benghazi and met with the chairman of the transitional National Council, Mustafa Abdul Jalil.
: The GCC has issued a statement that Gaddafi and his regime has lost legitimacy and that the GCC will form a relationship with the National Transitional Council.
International Monetary Fund: At the weekly IMF news conference on 26 August 2011, Spokesman David Hawley informed reporters that the Fund is monitoring the situation in Libya and that "When there is a clear, broad-based international recognition of a new government in Libya, it's at that point that the Fund could or would move toward recognition... The nature of our engagement going forward will depend on the wishes of any internationally recognised government in the country. So to underline, we're following events". Christine Lagarde said on 10 September that the "IMF membership recognized the National Transition Council as the new government of Libya."
: On 22 June 2011 OIC sent a delegation to Benghazi and Tripoli to hold consultations with fighting sides. On 13 July OIC sent another delegation "to hold talks with the National Transitional Council in Benghazi." On 25 August IOC delegation took part in the fifth meeting of Libya Contact Group, where "participants ... agreed to deal with the National Transitional Council as the legitimate governing authority in Libya". In a speech on 3 September, Secretary General Ekmeleddin İhsanoğlu said the OIC recognised the NTC "as the only legitimate authority in Libya".
 Organization of Petroleum Exporting Countries: On 6 September Dow Jones Newswires appeared an article reporting that OPEC members are waiting on United Nations resolution to recognise NTC as legitimate government, which they did at 19 September.
: A press release issued by Secretary-General Ban Ki-moon on 26 August 2011 made references to the "new Libyan authorities" and stated that $1.5 billion in Gaddafi regime assets will be released to "the authorities Transitional National Council (TNC)". Deputy Secretary-General Asha-Rose Migiro also made references to "the new leadership". A further press release issued on 30 August 2011 made references to "Libya's transitional authorities" Following a meeting between senior members of the NTC and Ian Martin, the representative of the Secretary-General for post-conflict planning in Libya, the official press release again referred to the NCT as "the new Libyan authorities". The General Assembly voted by a tally of 114 for and 17 against to give Libya's UN seat to the NTC on 16 September. The General Assembly's Credentials Committee had earlier recommended that the NTC's credentials to the seat be accepted. Angola led the resistance to the NTC's recognition, arguing that proper process had not been followed in the presentation and acceptance of the NTC's credentials. Venezuela and Bolivia also opposed the NTC's recognition.  Egypt, Libya's eastern neighbour, supported the recognition of the NTC.
World Bank: On 13 September 2011, the Bank released a statement announcing that "it is engaging with the National Transitional Council as the Government of Libya".
World Organization of Libyan Jews: On 17 July 2011, the group of 200,000 Jewish refugees and ex-refugees from Libya, most of whom now reside in Israel, sent a letter to National Transitional Council Chairman Mustafa Abdul Jalil recognising the council as the legitimate government of Libya. The group appointed established NTC proponent David Gerbi, an Italian Libyan, as its permanent representative in Benghazi, though Abdul Jalil asked that Gerbi postpone his arrival in Benghazi "until the end of the revolution". The Italian foreign ministry reported that the letter was "well received" by the NTC. Gerbi visited the Nafusa Mountains  in August and September, where he was received by Amazigh representatives, and is reportedly planning to meet with Abdul Jalil in Tripoli later in the month.

Individuals
The following individuals expressed their support for the council:

Ibrahim Al-Dabashi, Deputy Libyan ambassador to the U.N, has stated that he is now representing the National Transitional Council.
Mohammed El Senussi, current Pretender to the Libyan Throne, stated he supports the National Transitional Council as long as they continue to act in the best interest of the Libyan people.
Yusuf al-Qaradawi, Egyptian Islamist Sheikh, declared his support for the rebels led by the Council in the 2011 Libyan civil war, urging Arab nations to recognise the Council and “to confront the tyranny of the regime in Tripoli". He suggested weapons be sent to the rebels to assist them, and said “Our Islamic nation should stand against injustice and corruption and I urge the Egyptian government to extend a helping hand to Libyan people and not to Gaddafi.”

See also
International reactions to the 2011 Libyan civil war
Libya Contact Group
List of states with limited recognition
London Conference on Libya
United Nations General Assembly Resolution 2758

References

Diplomatic recognition
Foreign relations of Libya